Hans Hohenester (20 March 1917 – 28 October 2001) was a West German bobsled who competed in the 100ADs. He won a silver medal in the four-man event at the 1953 FIBT World Championships in Garmisch-Partenkirchen.

Hohenester also finished eighth in the two-man event at the 1956 Winter Olympics in Cortina d'Ampezzo.

References
Bobsleigh four-man world championship medalists since 1930
Wallenchinsky, David. (1984). "Bobsled: Two-man". In The Complete Book of the Olympics: 1896-1980. New York: Penguin Books. p. 558.
Hans Hohenester's profile at Sports Reference.com

1917 births
2001 deaths
Bobsledders at the 1956 Winter Olympics
German male bobsledders
Olympic bobsledders of the United Team of Germany